Royal Air Force Aboukir or more simply RAF Aboukir is a former Royal Air Force base located  northwest of Kafr El-Dawar and  east of Alexandria, Egypt. Between 1916 and 1947 a number of units and squadrons were based there, including the central depot for RAF Middle East until 12 November 1939.

History

The base was used by the following squadrons:
 No. 29 Squadron RAF between 6 August 1936 and 12 September 1936 with Fairey Gordon light bombers.
 No. 56 Squadron RAF reformed here on 1 February 1920 with the Sopwith Snipe with a detachment at San Stephano until August 1923. However 56 Squadron was disbanded on 23 September 1922.
 No. 64 Squadron RAF from 1 August 1936 with the Hawker Demon until 16 August 1936 when the squadron moved to the United Kingdom.
 No. 80 Squadron RAF between 10 June 1919 and 1 February 1920 when the squadron disbanded, the squadron flew the Snipe.
 No. 94 Squadron RAF between August and October 1944 as a detachment with the Supermarine Spitfire VB.
 No. 112 Squadron RAF from 22 April 1941 and 31 May 1941 as a detachment with Hawker Hurricane I.
 No. 123 Squadron RAF between 19 June 1942 and 19 July 1942 with the Spitfire VB.
 No. 142 Squadron RAF from 13 October 1935 and 26 October 1935 with the Hawker Hart.
 No. 145 Squadron RAF was formed here on 15 May 1918 before moving to Abu Sueir on 1 June 1918.
 No. 208 Squadron RAF as a detachment between 18 April 1936 and 28 September 1938 with the Hawker Demon.
 No. 237 Squadron RAF as a detachment between 25 February 1944 and 19 April 1944 with the Spitfire VC & IX.
 No. 252 Squadron RAF between 6 February 1945 and 10 February 1945 with the Bristol Beaufighter X.
 No. 294 Squadron RAF as a detachment between 29 March 1944 and 6 June 1945 with Vickers Wellington IC.
 No. 451 Squadron RAF between 12 May 1941 and 1 July 1941 with the Hurricane I.
 No. 603 Squadron RAF between 21 December 1942 and 25 January 1943 with no aircraft.
 No. 651 Squadron RAF between 9 and 10 November 1945 with the Taylorcraft Auster V .

The base was also used by a number of different units during its lifetime:
 Headquarters 20th (Reserve) Wing between 25 July 1916 and 31 May 1917. 
 RAF Depot, Middle East between 7 October and 12 November 1939.
 No. 103 Maintenance Unit RAF between 12 November 1939 and 30 October 1946.

Current use
The site is un-recognizable and is used for farming.

See also
 List of North African airfields during World War II

References

Citations

Bibliography

External links 
 Photo of Aboukir base

Royal Air Force stations in Egypt
Royal Air Force stations of World War II in Egypt
World War II airfields in Egypt